Raiders of Ghost City is a 1944 American Western film serial from Universal Pictures set in California during the American Civil War.

Plot
At the height of the Civil War, a gang of supposed Confederates, headed by Alex Morel, raid all gold shipments from Oro Grande, California, bound for Washington. Captain Steve Clark is recognized as a Union Secret Service agent by Morel's accomplice Trina Dessard, along with his friend Idaho Jones, is ambushed in the baggage car and sent to almost certain death when the car is un-coupled and plunges down the mountainside.

Leaping to safety, Idaho and Steve report to Colonel Sewell in Oro Grande, and Idaho introduces himself as a Wells Fargo detective to Cathy Haines the Oro Grande company agent. Steve and Idaho learn that the Morel raiders are only posing as Confederates, and their headquarters are at Morel's "Golden Eagle" saloon. He also discovers that members of the gang use old European coins with the date "1752" as identification.

In a raid on the hideout, Steve's brother Jim is killed by the gang. The next victim is Confederate Army Captain Clay Randolph who has discovered that Morel is connected with a group of Prussian spies who have been using the stolen gold to initially finance Prussia's wars but later to buy Alaska from the Russian Empire as a "club over Canada"; hed gives Steve a clue before he dies. The date 1752 of the recognition coins is explained as the date of Frederick the Great's Testament that supposedly gave instructions how Prussia would take over the world.

The clue leads Steve to a San Francisco dive owned by Abel Rackerby, who thinking he has Steve in his power, exposes the ring's activities and operation methods. Aided by the San Francisco Secret Service, Steve escapes and returns to Oro Grande where he and Idaho round up the spies.

Cast
 Dennis Moore as Captain Steve Clark
 Wanda McKay as Cathy Haines
 Lionel Atwill as Erich von Rugen, alias Alex Morel
 Joe Sawyer as Idaho Jones
 Regis Toomey as Captain Clay Randolph
 Virginia Christine as Countess Elsa von Merck, alias Trina Dressard
 Eddy Waller as Doc Blair
 Emmett Vogan as Count Manfried von Rinkton, alias Carl Lawton
 Addison Richards as Colonel Sewell
 Charles Wagenheim as Hugo Metzger, alias Abel Rackerby
 Jack Ingram as Braddock, Confederate outlaw

Production

Stunts
 Frank McCarroll
 Ken Terrell
 Dale Van Sickel (including being the fight double for Dennis Moore)
 Henry Wills

Critical reception
Cline writes that Raiders of Ghost City had a "good cast and production values...It came off quite well."

Chapter titles
 Murder by Accident
 Flaming Treachery
 Death Rides Double
 Ghost City Terror
 The Fatal Lariat
 Water Rising
 Bullet Avalanche
 Death Laughs Last
 Cold Steel
 Showdown
 The Trail to Torture
 Calling all Buckboards
 Golden Vengeance
Source:

See also
 List of film serials
 List of film serials by studio

Notes

References
 White, Raymond Hollywood Cowboys Go to War: The B-Western Movie during World War II Under Western Stars # 25 (Sept. 1986)

External links

1944 films
American Civil War films
American black-and-white films
1940s English-language films
Universal Pictures film serials
Films set in ghost towns
Films directed by Ray Taylor
Films directed by Lewis D. Collins
1944 Western (genre) films
American Western (genre) films
1940s American films